Valandovo is a municipality in the southern part of North Macedonia. Valandovo is also the name of the town where the municipal seat is found. Valandovo Municipality is part of Southeastern Statistical Region.

Geography
The municipality borders Demir Kapija Municipality to the northwest, Konče Municipality to the north, Strumica Municipality to the northeast, Greece to the east, Dojran Municipality and Bogdanci Municipality to the south, and Gevgelija Municipality to the southwest.

Demographics

According to the last national census from 2021, this municipality has 10,580 inhabitants.
Ethnic groups in the municipality include:

References

External links
 Official website

 
Southeastern Statistical Region
Municipalities of North Macedonia